Péhunco or Péhonko is a town, arrondissement and commune located in the Atakora Department of Benin.

References

Communes of Benin
Populated places in the Atakora Department
Arrondissements of Benin